The President and Trustees of Colby College is an 501(c) organization which is the governing body of Colby College, a private liberal arts college located in Waterville, Maine, United States. As of 2017, the president is David A. Greene, and the chair of Board is Eric S. Rosengren.

The organization provides general supervision of the administration and property of the College, including appointment of the President.

Structure
The bylaws of the corporation provide that membership shall consist of the current President, and not fewer than twenty-four nor more than thirty-five other Trustees. Not fewer than six nor more than nine of said Trustees shall be elected by the Colby College Alumni Association.  The term of office of each Trustee lasts five years.  The corporation meets three times annually.  Both the faculty and the student body may elect two members each as representatives to attend meetings of the corporation, but not as voting members.

Presidents

Trustees

Chairs of the Board

Other Notable Trustees

References

External links

Colby College
Colby College
Colby College Presidents and Trustees
Colby College